Karel Klapálek, CBE, DSO (25 May 1893 – 18 November 1984) was a Czechoslovak Army general and a veteran of the Czechoslovak Legion in the Russian Empire. He fought in both World Wars and was decorated with numerous national honours.

Early life
Klapálek was born in Nové Město nad Metují in north-eastern Bohemia, then part of Austria-Hungary. His father, a railwayman, died when Karel was eight. His mother was widowed with five children and the family was very poor. Karel went to primary school in the town of Kralupy nad Vltavou and high school in Prague, graduating in 1911 and taking a job as an accountant in a small factory that made automatic pumps.

First World War
In 1915 Klapálek joined the 8th Regiment of the Imperial-Royal Landwehr and was posted to Halicz in Galicia. He fought on the Russian front and was captured by Russian forces on 23 September 1915.

Klapálek enlisted in the Czechoslovak Legion in Tashkent in 1916, and on 6 August 1916 he joined the 1st Artillery Regiment as a soldier. After the successful Battle of Zborov he was promoted to warrant officer. He served in the 3rd Czechoslovak Infantry Regiment, fighting in most of the battles of the Czechoslovak Legion in Russia before contracting tuberculosis. Klapálek returned to Czechoslovakia with the Legion in 1920.

1920–39
After World War I, Klapálek became a commissioned officer and helped to establish the army of the newly-founded First Czechoslovak Republic. He served in Plzeň, Prague, Michalovce, and Uzgorod, where he met his future wife Olga Košutová (born 8 March 1901). He then served in Milovice and at the Military Academy in Hranice.

In the interwar period, Klapálek married Olga, and their daughter Olga was born on 24 March 1926. Olga Klapálková kept a diary, which later provided the basis for a book in which she described life in a Nazi concentration camp in Svatobořice near Kyjov, where she was held in the Second World War. Later in life Olga also published her husband's memoirs, Voják vypravuje.

Second World War
After Nazi Germany imposed the Protectorate of Bohemia and Moravia in March 1939, Klapálek joined a Czech military anti-Nazi resistance organization Obrana národa (Protection of the Nation) in České Budějovice. After the organization was destroyed in 1940 he fled the country and reached Mandatory Palestine, where he joined the 4th Czechoslovak Infantry Regiment, later reorganized as the Czechoslovak 11th Infantry Battalion (East), with Klapálek as its commander. The battalion fought in the Allied invasion of Syria and Lebanon in June and July 1941, and was then stationed on the Turkish border in August. From October to December 1941 the battalion fought in the defence of Tobruk under the command of the Polish Independent Carpathian Rifle Brigade.

After its success at Tobruk the battalion was withdrawn to the rear. In May 1942 it was reorganized as the 200th Czechoslovak Light Anti-Aircraft Regiment, with Klapálek remaining as its commander. The regiment returned to the Levant, where it defended Haifa, Beirut, and Az-Zeeb. Early in 1943 returned to Tobruk, which it defended until June.

In July 1943 the regiment was transferred by sea to Great Britain, where it became part of the Czechoslovak Independent Armoured Brigade. Klapálek reached Britain in August and was made second-in-command of the brigade.

From March 1944 Klapálek was stationed in London as head of Department I of the Ministry of Defence of the Czechoslovak government-in-exile. In August 1944 he transferred to the Soviet Union, where he commanded the 3rd Czechoslovak Independent Brigade. In September and October he led the brigade in the Battle of the Dukla Pass.

In April 1945 Ludvík Svoboda promoted Klapálek to commander of the Czechoslovak 1st Army Corps. Klapálek successfully led the army in the Battle for Břest. On 17 May 1945 Klapálek returned to Prague on a white horse, leading the Czechoslovak soldiers who had fought abroad.

1945–56
Between 1945 and 1950 Klapálek served as an army officer in Prague. Along with Svoboda he supported the Communist coup d'état of February 1948, by establishing the Central office of the National Front. He joined the Communist party in June 1948.

In the political trials of Czechoslovak soldiers who had served with Western forces, Klapálek tried to protect his former colleagues. In 1949 he received a threatening letter encouraging him to leave the country. Klapálek did not take it seriously, but in 1951 he was sent into retirement. After the high-profile political trial of Rudolf Slánský in 1952, the Communists confiscated all of Klapálek's property and imprisoned him in Valdice prison. He was disgraced, expelled from the Communist party, and deprived of his civil rights. In 1954 he was convicted of sabotage. Klapálek was released from prison in 1956 after the Soviet marshals Georgy Zhukov and Ivan Konev spoke in his defence, but he was not rehabilitated until 1968.

Memoirs and national honours

Klapálek published his memoirs in a book called Ozvěny bojů in 1968. Ludvik Svoboda, the president of Czechoslovakia, awarded him with the title Hero of the ČSR after having already received the Order of the Red Star and the Order of the 25th February (cs). Klapálek was designated an "honorable citizen" of his hometown, Nové Město nad Metují. In 1984 he was awarded his last National Honour, the Order of the Red Flag.

General Klapálek died 18 November 1984 at the age of 91. He is buried in Olšany Cemetery in Prague.

In 2009 Klapálek was nominated for the Order of the White Lion in memoriam. A public debate followed over whether he deserved the Order or not, given his actions in 1948. Czech President Václav Klaus eventually declined to give him the Honour.

National honours
 Order of the Red Star
 Order of the 25th February
 Hero of the ČSR
 Order of the Red Flag

References

Sources

1893 births
1984 deaths
Austro-Hungarian military personnel of World War I
Czech communists
Czech generals
Czechoslovak generals
Czechoslovak military personnel of World War II
Heroes of the Czechoslovak Socialist Republic
People from Nové Město nad Metují
Recipients of the Order of the Red Banner
Czech military leaders
Burials at Olšany Cemetery